The 2017 China International Challenger Jinan was a professional tennis tournament played on hard courts. It was the first edition of the tournament which was part of the 2017 ATP Challenger Tour. It took place in Jinan, China between 7 and 12 August 2017.

Singles main-draw entrants

Seeds

 1 Rankings are as of 31 July 2017.

Other entrants
The following player received a wildcard into the singles main draw:
  Zhang Zhizhen

The following player received entry into the singles main draw with a protected ranking:
  Saketh Myneni

The following players received entry from the qualifying draw:
  Vijay Sundar Prashanth
  Sidharth Rawat
  Kento Takeuchi

The following players received entry as lucky losers:
  Sergey Betov
  Mousheg Hovhannisyan
  Toshihide Matsui

Champions

Singles

 Lu Yen-hsun def.  Ričardas Berankis 6–3, 6–1.

Doubles

 Hsieh Cheng-peng /  Peng Hsien-yin def.  Sriram Balaji /  Vishnu Vardhan 4–6, 6–4, [10–4].

References

2017 ATP Challenger Tour
Jinan
2017 in Chinese tennis